CEG Godomey is a public secondary school located in Godomey, Benin. This school was founded in 1984 and is officially known as the secondary school of Godomey. Since its foundation it welcomes every student around Godomey and elsewhere.

References

External links 

Secondary schools in Benin
Educational institutions established in 1984
Schools in Benin
1984 establishments in Benin